The Malta national cricket team is the team that represents the Republic of Malta in international cricket. The team is organised by the Malta Cricket Association, which became an affiliate member of the International Cricket Council (ICC) in 1998. and an associate member in 2017. A Maltese national team first played as early as 1891, when an XVIII of Malta played an English team on its way to a tour of Australia. The team was not revived until 1990, when it participated in the European Cricketer Cup in Guernsey. Since then, Malta has appeared regularly in European Cricket Council tournaments, generally in the lower divisions.

History

2018-Present
In April 2018, the ICC decided to grant full Twenty20 International (T20I) status to all its members. Therefore, all Twenty20 matches played between Malta and other ICC members after 1 January 2019 will be a full T20I.

Malta played its first official T20I against, Spain, on 29 March 2019 during the 2019 Spain Triangular T20I Series. The match was played at La Manga Club, Murcia, Spain.

International competition

Malta competed in every edition of the European Affiliates Championship from 1999 to 2005, their best result coming in 2001 when they reached the semi finals. They competed in the tournament predecessor, the European Nations Cup in 1997, and competed in its successor, Division Three of the European Championship in 2007, 2009, 2011 and 2012.

In October 2013, Malta hosted an International Tournament, inviting the International Cricket Associations of the Czech Republic, asary and Russia. Malta played their games from 4 to 6 October. Khosla captained the side to 3 wins out of 3, culminating in a final day victory over Hungary where the latter could've also won the tournament with a victory. The winning runs were scored on a wide delivery with Haroon Majeed facing the ball.

Malta followed up their success with a second successive International Tournament victory in Budapest, Hungary. Malta defeated the UAE in the final in a tournament compromising of Hungary, Poland, Austria, Czech Republic, UAE and Malta. Bikram Arora hit the winning runs with a drive to the leg-side which made it to the boundary. Malta's Christopher Chellew won the Player of the Tournament and also scored the most runs in tournament.

Malta competed in a third International Tournament along with Sweden, Poland and Czech Republic, hosted by the latter in Prague. Malta had their 7 match unbeaten run ended by Sweden, when Malta fell 5 runs short of the Swedes' first innings target of 198 runs. Heavy rain and poor weather conditions all round caused Malta's game with Czech Republic to first be suspended and then abandoned in the 2nd innings after Malta were bowled out for 122. Malta got their first and only win of the tournament by successfully  chasing 140 runs against Poland, who had already wrapped up the Tournament for themselves the previous day. This left Malta third in the table, level on points on Sweden but behind them on net run rate.

In September of the same year, Malta hosted Hungary in a 3-match series. The first two games were T20s with the first game being a decisive Malta victory while the second saw Hungary become the first National Cricket Team to win in Malta. The final game was a 50-Over Match. Hungary batted first and were bowled out for 121 runs. Chellew scored a half-century to inspire Malta to victory and a series win.

Domestic cricket

Malta boasts a climate that enables cricket to be played all year round and encourages visiting teams to come and play on the island. There are two grounds: Marsa Cricket Ground, in existence for over a century and Hal Safi Cricket Ground, which is rarely used. Twelve clubs contested the T20 2020 Summer League: Knight Kings, Super Kings, Southern Crusaders, Power Hitters, Swieqi United, Bugibba Blasters, Marsa, Msida Warriors, Overseas, American University of Malta, Paola Boys and Mater Dei. The 2019–20 Winter League took the form of a 50-overs Marsa Federations Cup, featuring five regional teams: Birkirkara Blues, Mellieha Stars, Rabat Titans, Sliema Riders and Valletta Vikings.

Grounds

Current squad

Updated June 2022

Records and Statistics 

International Match Summary — Malta
 
Last updated 3 July 2022

Twenty20 International 
 Highest team total: 216/8 v. Bulgaria, 23 September 2020 at National Sports Academy, Sofia.
 Highest individual score: 104*, Varun Thamotharam v. Gibraltar, 21 August 2021 at Gucherre Cricket Ground, Albergaria.
 Best individual bowling figures: 5/37, Waseem Abbas v. Romania, 4 September 2021 at Moara Vlasiei Cricket Ground, Ilfov County.

Most T20I runs for Malta

Most T20I wickets for Malta

T20I record versus other nations

Records complete to T20I #1606. Last updated 3 July 2022.

See also
 List of Malta Twenty20 International cricketers

References

External links
 

Cricket in Malta
National cricket teams
Cricket
Malta in international cricket